Tsukamurella pseudospumae is a bacterium from the genus Tsukamurella which has been isolated from activated sludge foam from an activated sludge treatment plant in England.

References

External links
Type strain of Tsukamurella pseudospumae at BacDive -  the Bacterial Diversity Metadatabase
	

Mycobacteriales
Bacteria described in 2004